Umar Rida Kahhalah ( (1905 - 1987)) was a historian, scholar, and writer from Damascus, Syria. He published many important works on Arabic history, as well as indices of biographies of Arab scholars and intellectuals.

Published works
 - 4 volumes, bibliographic-biographical dictionary; "indispensable reference work for Arabic scholars and librarians."

Bibliography
;On ʻUmar Riḍā Kaḥḥālah's Muʻjam al-muʼallifīn.

External links 
 Umar Kahhala (arabic)

1905 births
1987 deaths
Arabists
Bibliographers
Encyclopedists
Writers from Damascus
Syrian biographers
Syrian lexicographers
20th-century Syrian historians
20th-century Syrian writers
20th-century lexicographers